Essunga Municipality (Essunga kommun) is a municipality in Västra Götaland County in western Sweden. Its seat is located in the town of Nossebro.

The 1952 municipal reform in Sweden saw the creation of Essunga Municipality out of eight original entities. In 1974 it was dissolved and part of Vara Municipality until 1983, when it was reestablished within the boundaries of 1952. The village of Essunga is a minor settlement just east of Nossebro.

References

External links
 
Essunga Municipality - Official site

Municipalities of Västra Götaland County
Skaraborg